Krzysztof Żuk (born 1957 in Krasnystaw) is a Polish economist, and since 2010, the mayor of the city of Lublin. He previously served as deputy mayor of Lublin from 2006 to 2007, was the chairperson of Świdnik City Council from 1990 to 1996, and the Undersecretary of State at the Polish Ministry of State Treasury from 2007 to 2009.

Biography

Awards 
 Order of Merit of Ukraine, Third Class (2020)
 Silver Cross of Merit, 2010

References 

1957 births
Living people
Recipients of the Order of Merit (Ukraine), 3rd class
Polish economists
Mayors of places in Poland
Civic Platform politicians
Recipients of the Silver Cross of Merit (Poland)
Politicians from Lublin
People from Lublin Voivodeship